Evan Gruzis is a contemporary artist born in 1979 in Milwaukee, Wisconsin, United States. He has lived and worked in Los Angeles and New York City, and, since 2012, has lived in Wisconsin with his partner, Nicole Rogers, and their child. Gruzis first became known for his vivid paintings, which have been described as "extremely flat sculptures." His work also includes elaborate installations as well as collaborations which blur the lines of curation and production. In addition to his artistic practice, Gruzis owns and operates The Heights, a collaborative restaurant in Madison, Wisconsin, and teaches painting and drawing at the School of the Art Institute of Chicago.

Gruzis earned his BFA in Painting from the University of Wisconsin, Madison in 2002 and his MFA in Combined Media from Hunter College, New York in 2008.

Artwork 
Gruzis uses painting, drawing, video installations, and sculpture to explore the "push and pull of imagery that is absurd but also seductive." His artwork, while often described as meticulous and crafted, also cultivates an improvisational collaboration between the work, the viewer, and their contexts. Often created with a recognizable palette which intentionally rejects earth tones, Gruzis’ work utilizes the "transcendence of synthetic colors" to explore "the fundamentals of perception and how that relates to simple stuff, like color, like the color of the inside of your eyelids." The images within the work and the objects themselves have often been referred to as intermediaries to uncharitable, subjective spaces.

Gruzis most recent work continues to explore the nature of collaboration as he increasingly focuses on “public projects, curatorial projects, [and] things that interface with the public on a greater frequency.” Condensed Matter Community, a recent experimental exhibition co-curated with Kristof Wickman, featured the work of 38 artists within the Synchrotron, a decommissioned particle accelerator in rural Wisconsin.

Exhibitions 
SOLO SHOWS

2019

 Evan Gruzis: Drop Shadow, Pizzuti Collection of the Columbus Museum of Art, OH

2016

 Real Feelings, The Green Gallery, Milwaukee, WI

2014

 Atavistic Zen, DUVE Berlin, Germany 
 Shell Game, The Suburban, Oak Park, IL

2012

 Alpha Wave, DUVE Berlin, Berlin, DE 
 Paper View, The Green Gallery, Milwaukee, WI

2013

 Strictly Method, Galerie SAKS, Geneva 

2011

 Exotic Beta, The Hole Gallery, New York, NY: 
 Shadow Work, Nicole Klagsbrun, New York, NY

2010

 Rough Boy, Galerie SAKS, Geneva, CH
 Dirty Black Summer Revisited, AMP Gallery, Athens, GR

2009

 Quazai, DUVE Berlin, Berlin, DE
 Touch Of Grey, The Journal Gallery, Brooklyn, NY

2008

 Dark Systems, Deitch Projects, New York, NY
 The Dusky Parlour, DUVE Berlin, Berlin, DE

GROUP SHOWS

2019

 With a Capital P: Selections by Six Painters, Elmhurst Art Museum, Elmhurst IL

2017

 American Genre: Contemporary Painting, ICA at Maine College of Art, Portland, ME 
 Milwaukee Collects, The Milwaukee Art Museum, Milwaukee, W

2014

 Sha Boogie Bop, Anonymous Gallery, New York, NY
 Buying Friends: The Ryan Kortman Collection, UICA, Grand Rapids, MI 
 Go With The Flow, The Hole, New York, NY

2013

 A Study In Midwest Appropriation, Hyde Park Art Center, Chicago, IL 
 Current Tendencies III, The Haggerty Museum of Art, Milwaukee, WI 
 XSTRACTION, The Hole, New York, NY

2012

 Art On Paper 2012: The 42nd Exhibition, Weatherspoon Art Museum, Greensboro, NC 
 Plantimplant, Dittrich & Schlechtriem, Berlin, Germany
 Portrait Of A Generation, The Hole, New York, NY
 Behind The Light, Pedro Cera Gallery, Lisbon, Portugal
 Casas De Empeño, Anonymous Gallery, Mexico City, Mexico

2011

 The Nightstands, Phillips De Pury and Company, New York, NY
 New York Minute, Garage Center for Contemporary Culture, Moscow, Russia

2010

 Salad Days, The Journal, Brooklyn, NY
 The Power of Selection Part 2, Western Exhibitions, Chicago, IL

2009

 New York Minute, Museo d’Arte Contemporanea Roma, Rome, Italy
 The Open, Deitch Projects, Long Island City, NY
 Black Hole, CCA Andratx, Mallorca, Spain
 Never Late Than Better, Elizabeth Foundation for the Arts, New York, NY

2008

 Mail Order Monsters, Max Wigram Gallery, London, UK
 Conceptual Figures, Deitch Projects, New York, NY
 Dark Fair, presented by the Milwaukee International, The Swiss Institute, New York, NY

2007

 Painted Objects, Harris Lieberman Gallery, New York, NY
 Famous Adults as Children, Famous Children as Adults, Monya Rowe Gallery, New York, NY 
Journal Drawings, The Journal, New York, NY

2006

 School Days, Jack Tilton Gallery, New York, NY

2004

 Happy Days are Here Again, David Zwirner Gallery, New York, NY

2002

 Man Walks Into a Room, Dumbo Arts Center, Brooklyn, NY

Bibliography 
MONOGRAPHS

 Gruzis, Evan. Existential Crisis: 38 Drawings & 41 Paintings. New York: Anteism. 2011. 
 Gruzis, Evan, and Jaime Schwartz. Evan Gruzis, Quazai. Berlin: DUVE Berlin. 2010. 
 Gruzis, Evan, Mara Hoberman and Joachim Pissarro. Dark Systems. New York: Deitch Projects. 2008.

CATALOGS

 Bartels, Dominique, Thomas Collier. American Genre: Contemporary Painting. Portland, ME: Institute of Contemporary Art. 2017. 2, 57. 
 Kortman, Ryan, ed. Buying Friends: The Ryan Kortman Collection. Grand Rapids, MI: Urban Institute for Contemporary Art. 2015. 39, 100. 
 Grayson, Kathy, ed. Portrait of a Generation. New York: The Hole. 2013. 52.

Selected Collections 

 Whitney Museum of American Art, New York, NY 
 Milwaukee Art Museum, Milwaukee, WI 
 Hood Museum of Art, Dartmouth College, NH 
 The Hort Family Collection, New York, NY 
 The Pizzuti Collection, Columbus, OH 
 The Tishman-Speyer Collection, New York, NY 
 The Deste Foundation Collection, Athens, Greece 
 The Depart Foundation, Rome, Italy 
 CCA Andraxt, Mallorca, Spain 
 The Northwestern Mutual Collection 
 The Soho House Group
 The Ryan Kortman Collection

References

External links 
 http://evangruzis.com/
http://www.thegreengallery.biz/artists/evan-gruzis
https://www.columbusmuseum.org/blog/2019/09/09/the-work-of-evan-gruzis/
https://madison.com/ct/entertainment/arts-and-theatre/an-artistic-appetite-evan-gruzis/article_e1971027-9bef-5ab6-a57e-78a0ca12a5e4.html

1979 births
Living people
People from Brooklyn
Artists from Milwaukee
Hunter College alumni
University of Wisconsin–Madison College of Letters and Science alumni
Artists from New York City
Painters from Wisconsin